Pınarbaşı is a village in the Sincik District, Adıyaman Province, Turkey. The village is populated by Kurds of the Reşwan and had a population of 230 in 2021.

The hamlets of Akçalı, Çakoli, Revrişe and Şahkolu are attached to the village.

References

Villages in Sincik District
Kurdish settlements in Adıyaman Province